Islamovo (İslam) is a rural locality (a village) in Yumashevsky Selsoviet, Baymaksky District, Bashkortostan, Russia. The population was 4 as of 2010. There is 1 street.

Geography 
Islamovo is located 39 km southwest of Baymak (the district's administrative centre) by road. Yumashevo is the nearest rural locality.

References 

Rural localities in Baymaksky District